Joaquin Gonzalez may refer to:

Joaquin Gonzalez (politician) (1853 - 1900), Filipino politician
Joaquin Gonzalez (American football) (b. 1979)
Joaquín V. González (1863 - 1923), Argentine politician and academic